Korea has had a number of capitals. Korea is a peninsula in East Asia, currently the peninsula is divided into two countries: North Korea's capital is Pyongyang, and South Korea's capital is Seoul.

During Gojoseon
Gojoseon:
 Asadal — (legend, unknown)
 Wanggeom (modern Pyongyang) — Second capital (post 400 BCE)

During the Three Kingdoms of Korea
 Jolbon — first capital of Goguryeo
 Gungnae City — second capital of Goguryeo
 Pyongyang — third capital of Goguryeo
 Wiryeseong (modern Seoul) — first capital of Baekje
 Ungjin (modern Gongju) — second capital of Baekje
 Sabi (modern Buyeo County) — third capital of Baekje
 Gyeongju — capital of Silla

During the North–South States Period
North–South States Period:
 Gyeongju — capital of Silla
 Dongmo Mountain — first capital of Balhae
 Junggyeong — second capital of Balhae
 Sanggyeong — third capital of Balhae

During the Later Three Kingdoms
Later Three Kingdoms:
 Gyeongju — capital of Silla
 Wansanju (modern Jeonju) — capital of Later Baekje
 Songak (modern Kaesong) — first capital of Taebong
 Cheorwon (modern Cheorwon County) — second capital of Taebong

During Goryeo
Goryeo
 Gaegyeong (modern Kaesong)

During Joseon
Joseon and Korean Empire
 Hanseong (Seoul)

Modern capitals
 Seoul — capital of South Korea a.k.a. Republic of Korea (ROK)
 Pyongyang — capital of North Korea a.k.a. Democratic People's Republic of Korea (DPRK)

Notes

References

Korea
Korea
Geography of Korea
Government of Seoul
History of Korea